Spizzenergi are an English punk/new wave band led by vocalist/guitarist Spizz (real name Kenneth Spiers, born Solihull 1959). Formed in the late 1970s, the band changed its name every year, subsequent names including Athletico Spizz 80, Spizzoil and the Spizzles.

They are notable as the first band to top the newly created UK Indie Chart early in 1980 with the single "Where's Captain Kirk?" More than two decades after its release, it was included in Mojo magazine's list of the best punk rock singles of all time.

Spizz's early years / Spizzoil
Spizz attended Arden School, Knowle, near Solihull, a comprehensive school in the West Midlands, and was inspired by the burgeoning punk rock movement. After a Siouxsie and the Banshees gig at Barbarella's in Birmingham, he jumped on stage and sang, leading to a recording deal. He was already performing (solo) by 1977. Spizz soon got together with like-minded guitarist Pete Petrol (real name Pete O'Dowd), with whom he released a few singles during the height of punk's popularity. In 1978 Palmolive, drummer with the Slits, joined the band, then named Spizzoil, for a few gigs.

The band supported Siouxsie and the Banshees, among others, and later toured as a headline act in many European countries.

Their lineup in late 1979 consisted of Spizz on vocals and guitar, Mark Coalfield on keyboard and vocals, Dave Scott on guitar, Jim Solar (real name James Little) on bass guitar and Hero Shima (real name Suresh Singh) on drums. With a distinctively new wave sound, as Spizzenergi they became the first number one band on the newly formed UK Indie Singles Chart in January 1980. BBC Radio 1 disc jockey John Peel described "Where's Captain Kirk?"  as "the best Star Trek associated song". Spizz created the artwork for the single cover using felt pens. This was the peak of Spizz's commercial popularity.

This lineup continued as Athletico Spizz 80, gaining a considerable following. They became the only band to sell out the Marquee Club for five consecutive nights (with a sixth alcohol-free, matinee show). "Where's Captain Kirk?" was featured in the 1981 live music film Urgh! A Music War. This material was shown occasionally on late-night American cable TV, and may have helped prolong Spizz's fame. The band released an album entitled Do a Runner on A&M Records, to mixed reviews.

When Lu Edmonds joined the lineup in 1981, the band changed its name to the Spizzles. The group released a record called Spikey Dream Flowers, which cemented the group's sonic image as science-fiction weirdos. Two final 1982 singles, this time as Spizzenergi 2, "Megacity 3" and "Jungle Fever", were the swan song of Spizz in the 1980s. By 1982, the second wave of punk in the UK was over, and post-punk bands were taking over the indie music scene.

Spizz was noted for his annual name change policy, which ceased when the Guinness Book of Records failed to recognise his claim that he had recorded and released the greatest number of recordings under different names (though the book's deputy editor, Shelagh Thomas, nevertheless confessed to owning "Where's Captain Kirk?"). American stadium rockers R.E.M. (who started their band in the early 1980s) recorded a limited edition version of "Where's Captain Kirk?" in 1992, which they gave to fan club members.

1983–2009
After the demise of Spizzenergi 2, Spizz embarked on several solo projects (as SpizzOrwell and performing on The Last Future Show) and played guitar for Heaven 17. In 1985, he toured with backing tapes and female backing singers as Spizz and the Astronauties. After a dance mix of Where's Captain Kirk? in 1987, he had no significant chart success.

The birth of a daughter, Molly Spiers-MacLeod in 1991, consumed the bulk of his energy as he stayed home to care for her. The fully-grown Spiers-MacLeod later became a bass player and contributing songwriter for the Poussez Posse (a band fronted by Georgina Baillie and mentored by Adam Ant) before leaving with fellow Posse members Danie Cox and Rachael Smith to form self-styled "flock rock" band the Featherz, who toured supporting Boy George, before she eventually left in May 2014. Currently, she plays in the Crack Foxes, Rat Pussy and the Untitled Band Project under the name Molly Energi. as well as in I, Doris under the name Stunt Bass Doris. She and Cox also provided backing vocals for Wild Mutation, a glam-era covers band that Spizz himself fronted, and were both members of 2012 anniversary lineup Spizz '77.

Aside from these projects, Spizz has continued to appear live, owing to the encouragement of Paul Hallam, and releases material through Cherry Red Records. One exception was a release on Hallam's own label 442ok called "We're the England", his third England World Cup song attempt (previously "E for England" in 1998 and "On the Road to Yokohama" in 2002). Other Spizz football-related songs are "The Sun Never Sets on Aston Villa" (which appears on the club's official compact disc), "Three Lions in the Sky" (which was aimed at a television producer) and his own label "company song", "442ok".

In May 2006, a maxi-single of the earliest known recording of "Where's Captain Kirk?" (from Spizz's own archives) was released.

From 2007, the band Spizzenergi performed at mini festivals in Milan, Bologna and Leuven. In May 2009, they supported the New York Dolls at the 100 Club.

Current activities
In 2012, Spizz and existing member Jeff Walker (drums) were joined by Luca Comencini (guitar), Ben Lawson (bass) and Phil Ross (guitar). Spizzenergi performed numerous shows, including the Joe Strummer/ Strummerville commemorative benefit festival at the 100 Club in London and a Fire Brigades Union benefit show along with Sex Pistols original bassist Glen Matlock and former guitarist of the Clash Mick Jones.
 
In 2013, Spizzenergi headlined shows in Leeds, London, Glasgow, Livingstone, Bristol, two consecutive and very successful shows at Berlin's Cortina Bob and guest slots with the Rezillos and Cockney Rejects.

Throughout 2014, the band played the Rebellion Festival in Blackpool, the Undercover Punk Festival in Bisley and other UK cities, and went on a short tour of Germany. They also supported '80s post-punk icon Toyah at a sold-out show at the O2 Academy Islington.

In September 2014, Spizzenergi released a single on 7" blood red vinyl through Plane Groovy Records entitled "City of Eyes", with a live studio version of "Soldier Soldier" on the B-side. The single was a cutting criticism of surveillance society, state intrusion and phone hacking. After playing it on his BBC show, DJ Gary Crowley stated that Spizz's "pen had never been sharper."

"City of Eyes" was accompanied by a highly acclaimed video shot by Brazilian art director Marcio Schenkel.

In 2015, the band released a docu-movie produced by director Phill Calland entitled The Road to Wakefield Pier, inspired by the George Orwell book The Road to Wigan Pier, in which the author documents 1930s poverty in the north of England and argues for socialism. The Road to Wakefield Pier includes live footage and interviews shot in Wakefield when the band played in the town at Warehouse23.

The band also completed a five-city UK tour with Spear of Destiny, a double headline St. Valentine show with Department S, and a repeat appearance at the Undercover Festival.

2015 also saw headline shows in London, Munich and Augsburg, as well as five UK cities with Theatre of Hate, and back-to-back gigs in Edinburgh and Glasgow with The Rezillos.

On September 20, 2016, the band headlined the 100 Club's 40th-anniversary punk festival. 2016 also saw the band perform at the Rebellion and Undercover punk festivals, the London Punk Festival, their own annual summer party at the Dublin Castle, and in a guest appearance at the 2016 Bowie Convention in Derby.

The band planned a 2017 live schedule to promote the release of a new vinyl single called "Here Come the Machines" and a reworking of "Red and Black" from the 1980 debut album.

Long term drummer Jeff Walker was replaced in early 2020 by ex-Department S and The Wigs, drummer Alan Galaxy.

In 2020 a new single mixed by Tony Visconti, "Christmas in Denmark Street" c/w "Shallow End" was released via Holy Dotage Records to great acclaim and, whilst not troubling the mainstream did reach number 7 in the Official UK Vinyl Chart and the top ten in Mike Read's much respected Heritage Chart. This was swiftly followed by a limited edition single of a faithful cover version of David Bowie's "Valentine's Day" which was again mixed by long term Bowie collaborator Tony Visconti, the initial pressing was issued on purple vinyl. Once again this made the Heritage Chart Top 10 along with a number 3 placing in the official UK vinyl chart.

The band continue to tour nationally and are currently working on a new album which will be the first new Spizz album for over 30 years.

Discography

Albums 
Do a Runner (as Athletico Spizz 80) (18 July 1980: A&M) # 27 UK Albums Chart

Cat No. AMLE 68514

Side 1:
Touched (2:40)
New Species (2:21)
Intimate (2:00)
Effortless (3:00)
European Heroes (2:10)
Energy Crisis (4:38)	

Side 2:
Red And Black (3:48)
The Rhythm Inside (2:30)
Personimpersonator (2:40)
Clocks Are Big (0:32)
Airships (8:41)

Spikey Dream Flower (as the Spizzles) (April 1981: A&M)

Cat No. AMLE 68523

Side 1:
Brainwashing Time (4:37)	
Five Year Mission (2:17)	
Dangers Of Living (3:32)	
Robot Holiday (2:27)
Soldier, Soldier (3:47)	

Side 2:
Downtown (3:00)
Risk (3:34)
Central Park (4:22)	
Melancholy (2:40)
Scared (4:00)

Compilation albums / EPs 
Spizz: Spizz History (November 1983: Rough Trade)
Spizz Oil: The Peel Sessions (February 1987: Strange Fruit)
Unhinged (March 1994: Damaged Goods)
Spizz Not Dead Shock: A Decade of Spizz History 1978 – 88 (May 1996: Cherry red)
Where’s Captain Kirk (May 2002: Cherry red)

Singles

John Peel sessions 
List of all John Peel radio recordings/sessions:
 1 August 1978 (Spizzoil)
 12 March 1979 (Spizzenergi)
 13 November 1979 (Spizzenergi)	
 30 April 1980 (Athletico Spizz 80)

See also
 List of new wave artists and bands
 List of British punk bands
 List of Peel sessions
 Music of the United Kingdom (1970s)

References

External links
Official site

Unofficial Spizzenergi site
Background info and interview
interview
Spizz interview

English punk rock groups
Musical groups established in 1979
Musical groups from Birmingham, West Midlands
English new wave musical groups
English post-punk music groups